Sir Wilfrid Lawson, 1st Baronet may refer to:

 Sir Wilfrid Lawson, 1st Baronet, of Isell (c. 1610–1688), MP for Cumberland 1659 and 1660 and Cockermouth 1660-1679
Sir Wilfrid Lawson, 1st Baronet, of Brayton (1795–1867)

See also
Wilfrid Lawson (disambiguation)